Setisquamalonchaea fumosa is a species of fly in the family Lonchaeidae. It is found in the Palearctic.

References

External links
Images representing  Setisquamalonchaea fumosa at BOLD

Lonchaeidae
Insects described in 1862
Diptera of Europe
Taxa named by Johann Egger